"E No Easy" is a 2009 song by P-Square featuring  J. Martins. It was revived as a bilingual French/English song "Positif", by Matt Houston featuring P-Square in 2012, becoming a hit in France.

"E No Easy"
"E No Easy" is a successful song by P-Square featuring J. Martins that was a hit locally in Nigeria. The song was written by the three singers Peter and Paul Okoye (actually the members of P-Square) and by J. Martins. It is taken from P-Square's album Danger.

A French version using the music of "E No Easy" and retitled "Positif" became a big hit in France. And after success of the French adaptation, "E No Easy" was also released finding some additional success in France in 2012.

In 2011, French-Algerian rapper El Matador had also included a mix of "E No Easy" credited to "El Matador feat P-Square" in his mixtape release Escale sur la lune. adding French rap verses, raï influences and additional Spanish lyrics to the track.

"Positif"

"Positif" is a 2012 bilingual song in French and English by Matt Houston featuring Nigerian brother duo P-Square. It is a remake of the earlier hit by P-Square with French lyrics added by Matthieu Gore (real name of Matt Houston)  
The song is taken from Houston's forthcoming album Racines as a first pre-release on 23 April 2012 from the album due in June 2012.

Houston sings the introductory French part while P-Square brother Peter and Paul are doing the backing vocals. The English parts are done by the Okoye brothers.

As a promotion, Matt Houston also released a "making of" video of his collaboration with Peter and Paul Okoye in the Video Clip Studios where the French hit was cut. It was the third of a series of "Welcome To My World" video episodes.

The official music video was uploaded on Matt Houston's VEVO channel on 4 May 2012.
The single featured at #47 in its first week of release and climbed up to #6 on the SNEP French Singles Chart.

Charts

"Positif" 
The release included the following track list:
"Positif" (featuring P-Square) – 3:49
"Positif" (featuring P-Square) – 3:51
"Positif" (Alex Rio Loco Remix) – 4:24
"Oh Gosh" (Chiré Remix) – 2:47

"E No Easy" 
Based on the success of "Positif", the English original "E No Easy" gained attention and popularity in France also entering the French SNEP charts reaching #141 on chart dated 26 May 2012.

References

2009 singles
2012 singles
Macaronic songs
P-Square songs
2009 songs